Short-toed lark refers to a number of species of lark:

 Asian short-toed lark (Alaudala cheleensis), found from south-central to eastern Asia
 Greater short-toed lark (Calandrella brachydactyla), found in Europe, northern Africa and Asia
 Hume's short-toed lark (Calandrella acutirostris), found in south-central Asia 
 Mediterranean short-toed lark (Alaudala rufescens), found in Europe, northern Africa and Asia
 Turkestan short-toed lark (Alaudala rufescens), found in Europe, northern Africa and Asia
 Mongolian short-toed lark (or, Syke's short-toed lark; Calandrella dukhunensis), found in India and western China
 Rufous short-toed lark, alternate name for Red-capped lark (Calandrella cinerea), found in eastern and southern Africa

Birds by common name